Karikala often referred to as Karikala the Great was a Tamil Emperor of the Early Cholas of the Chola dynasty who ruled Tamilakam in the Southern India from Uraiyur. He is credited with the construction of the flood banks of the river Kaveri. He is recognised as the greatest of the Early Cholas. In Thiruvalangadu plates of Rajendra Chola I, Medieval Tamil Cholas listed Karikala Chola as one of their ancestors. In Malepadu plates (7th century CE) of Renati Chola king Punyakumara, Telugu Cholas claimed that they belong to the family of Karikala Chola and praises him for stopping the overflow over the banks of river Kaveri.

Sources 
The story of Karikala is mixed with legend and anecdotal information gleaned from Sangam literature. The only sources available are the numerous mentions in Sangam poetry. The period covered by the extant literature of the Sangam is unfortunately not easy to determine with any measure of certainty.

Paṭṭiṉappālai, Poruṇarāṟṟuppaṭai and a number of individual poems in the Akanaṉūṟu and Purananuru have been the main source for the information that is attributed to Karikala.

No authentic records of Karikala's reign have been found so far. However many rulers and petty chiefs who came after him claimed him as their ancestor and decorated themselves as belonging to the Chola race of Karikala and of the Kashyapa gotra.

Early life 
Karikala was the son of Ilamcetcenni. The name Karikalan has been held to mean "the man with the charred leg" and perpetuates the memory of a fire accident in the early years of his life. Some scholars also hold the view kari and kalan are Tamil words meaning "slayer of elephants". Poruṇarāṟṟuppaṭai describes the back-formed origin legend of this incident as follows:Old Sangam Age inscriptions and also sthala puranam of great ancient Saiva shrine at Parasalur, near Mayavaram says that in order to escape the murder plot hatched by conspirators Karikal Valavan stayed there in disguise of a vedic and agama sastra lecturer for eight years.

Paṭṭiṉappālai, written in praise of Karikala also describes this incident, but without mention of the fable of the burnt limb:

Military conquests

Battle of Venni 

According to the  Poruṇarāṟṟuppaṭai, Karikala Chola fought a great Battle of Venni in which both Pandyan and Cheran king Uthiyan Cheralathan suffered a defeat. Although we know very little about the circumstances leading to this battle, there can be no doubt that it marked the turning point in Karikala’s career, for in this battle he broke the back of the powerful confederacy formed against him. Besides the two crowned kings of the Pandya and Chera countries, eleven minor chieftains took the opposing side in the campaign and shared defeat at the hands of Karikala. The Chera king, who was wounded on his back in the battle, committed suicide by starvation. Venni was the watershed in the career of Karikala which established him firmly on his throne and secured for him some sort of hegemony among the three crowned monarchs. Venni is also known as Vennipparandalai and now it is known as Kovilvenni and is situated near Thanjavur.

Further wars and conquests 
After the battle of Venni, Karikala had other opportunities to exercise his arms. He defeated the confederacy of nine minor chieftains in the battle of Vakaipparandalai. Paranar, a contemporary of Karikala, in his poem from Agananuru mentions this incident without giving any information on the cause of the conflict. According to legends Karikala was one of the few Chola kings who won the whole of Ceylon (Lanka). The Grand anicut was built after his conquest over the Singalese kingdom and he used Singalese war prisoners for the hard task of moving stones from the mountains to the river bed of the Kaveri. The Pattinappalai also describes the destruction caused by Karikala’s armies in the territories of his enemies and adds that as the result of these conflicts, the "Northerners and Westerners were depressed… and his flushed look of anger caused the Pandya’s strength to give way…".

Northern Expedition and Conquests 
After subduing the south Karikala went on an expedition to the north and engraved his tiger emblem in the Himalayas. The king of the great Vajra whose sway extended as far as the roaring sea (in the east), gave him a pearl canopy as a tribute while the king of Magadha famous for his sword-play, and his enemy a while ago, presented to him an audience hall (pattimandapam). The king of Avanti gave him a friendly present of a tall and beautiful arch on the gateway. Though all these were made of gold and gems, their technique was not known to human artists even of exceptional skill; they were long ago given to the ancestors of these three monarchs by the divine Maya in return for some valuable service rendered to him.

Grand Anicut 

Sometime between the reign of Sinhalese monarch Vankanasika Tissa, Karikala, with a large army, invaded the island and took away 12,000 Sinhalese men to work as slaves to build the Kaveri Dam.

Later Chola kings attributed the building of dikes along the banks of the Kaveri to Karikala.<ref name="Proceedings of the Indian History Congress, Volume 39, page 156">Proceedings of the Indian History Congress, Volume 39, page 156</ref> The raising of the banks of the river Kaveri by Karikala is also mentioned by the Malepadu plates (seventh century CE) of the Telugu Chola sovereign of Renadu, Erigal-Mutturaju Punyakumara, who claims descent from Karikala: karuna – saroruha vihita – vilochana – pallava – trilochana pramukha kilapritvisvara karita kaveri tira'' (he who caused the banks of the Kaveri to be constructed by all the subordinate kings led by the Pallava Trilochana whose third eye was blinded by his lotus foot).

The Grand Anicut, also known as the Kallanai was built by Karikala and is considered one of the oldest water-diversion or water-regulator structures in the world which is still in use. The Kallanai is a massive dam of unhewn stone, 329 metres (1,080 ft) long and 20 metres (60 ft) wide, across the main stream of the Kaveri. A later Chola record from Tiruvaduturai refers to this event that is raising the banks of the Kaveri by Parakesari Karikala Chola.

Perur Patteeswarar Temple 

After his victory over the Northern kingdoms of Vatsa, Magadha and Avantika, Karikala returned back to Tamil land and worshipped Lord Shiva at the Perur Pateeswarar Temple located at the banks of river Noyyal in present day Coimbatore. Karikala was an ardent devotee of Lord Shiva. He is said to have done the Kumbhabhishekham (sanctification ritual) of the temple through hundred golden vessels. A famous text named Perur Puranam was composed by Kachiyappa Munivar in Tamil on the origin of the temple.

Karikala Cholan Manimandapam 

Karikala Cholan Manimandapam (memorial hall) was built in honour of the king who built the Grand Anicut. The hall designed as per Chola architecture style was built at a cost of  21 million. It features a bronze statue of the king.

Dating Karikala 
According to Nilakanta Sastri Karikala reigned in 90 CE. However, V. R. Ramachandra Dikshitar states that the Karikala mentioned in Silappadikaram and Sangam literature are two different kings and the Karikala mentioned in Silappadikaram has nothing to do with Trilocana Pallava and nothing prevents another Karikala having flourished in Puhar a few centuries later. The copper-plate charters and stone inscription of the 10th and 11th centuries also mention two different Karikala thus unable to determine his exact reign.

See also 
 Legendary early Chola kings
 Tamil history from Sangam literature
 List of Tamil monarchs

References

Further reading 

 
 
 
 
 
 
 
 
 

Chola kings